Acta Facultatis Pharmaceuticae Universitatis Comenianae is a biannual peer-reviewed  open access scientific journal covering all areas of pharmacy. The editor in chief is Tatiana Foltánová (Comenius University). It is an official journal of Comenius University. In 2014 it was moved to the De Gruyter Open imprint and switched to full open access.

Abstracting and indexing 
The journals is abstracted and indexed in:
Chemical Abstracts Service
EBSCO databases
ProQuest databases
SCOPUS

External links 
 

Pharmacology journals
Publications established in 2006
English-language journals
Creative Commons Attribution-licensed journals
De Gruyter academic journals
Biannual journals